FujiGen Gakki, also known as FGN, is a Japanese musical instrument manufacturing company based in Matsumoto, Nagano. The company is named after Japan's iconic Mount Fuji. "Gen" means stringed instruments and "Gakki" means musical instrument – the name is literally translated to "Fuji Stringed Musical Instruments". FujiGen does OEM guitar manufacturing for well known guitar brands and they also manufacture their own brand of guitars known as FGN.

History 
FujiGen started production in 1960, making violins and classical guitars. In 1962, FujiGen started production of electric guitars. In the 1970s, FujiGen started making guitars (OEM) for companies such as Hoshino Gakki (Ibanez), CSL (Antoria), Kanda Shokai (Greco guitars) and Yamaha. In 1977–78, FujiGen went into a joint venture with Roland to produce guitar synthesizers. In 1981, FujiGen opted out of acoustic guitar production to mainly concentrate on solid body guitar production. FujiGen obtained a CNC router in mid 1981 for making guitar parts and also began to manufacture their own pickups starting in late 1981.

In 1981–82, FujiGen obtained the Fender Japan contract which lasted until 1996–97 and in 1983 FujiGen were producing 14,000 guitars a month with 80% of the guitars being made for export markets and 20% being made for Japanese domestic markets. In mid/late 1992, FujiGen obtained a part of the Orville by Gibson contract which ended in 1998 and from then on have made Epiphone Japan solid body guitars, some Gretsch models and their own branded FGN guitars. FujiGen still manufactures OEM guitars for companies like Ibanez and Epiphone but in much smaller quantities than in the past. FujiGen has three factories: the Omachi factory in Omachi, the Hirooka factory (established around 1992) in Shiojiri and the Matsumoto head office factory in Matsumoto.

In the mid-2010s FujiGen began producing rosewood interior elements in some Mazda vehicles.

Other Japanese OEM guitar makers 

Other OEM guitar manufacturers based in Japan similar to FujiGen include Chushin Gakki, Dyna Gakki, Guyatone, Iida Gakki, Kasuga, Matsumoku, Terada, and Tōkai Gakki.

Sources 
 
   originally published as 

Further reading

See also 
 Kent guitars

References

External links 

 Official website

1960 establishments in Japan
Manufacturing companies established in 1960
Guitar manufacturing companies
Companies based in Nagano Prefecture
Japanese brands
Musical instrument manufacturing companies of Japan